Juha Hautamäki (born 8 June 1982) is a Finnish former motorcycle speedway rider.

Career
Hautamäki is a four times national champion of Finland after winning the Finnish Individual Speedway Championship in 2005, 2007, 2008 and 2013.

He was a member of Finland team at Speedway World Cups.

Results

World Championships 
 Team World Championship (Speedway World Team Cup and Speedway World Cup)
 2003 – 7th place
 2004 – 3rd place in Qualifying round 1
 2006 – 7th place
 2007 – 8th place
 2008 – 2nd place in Qualifying round 2
 2009 – 3rd place in Qualifying round 2

European Championships 
 Individual European Championship
 2008 – 11th place in Semi-Final 1
 European Pairs Championship
 2007 –  Terenzano – 4th place (1 pt)

Domestic competitions 
 Finnish Team Championship 
 2008 Kotkat, Seinäjoki 
 2009 Kotkat, Seinäjoki
 2013 Kotkat, Seinäjoki
 2016 Porin Nopea Racing, Pori 
 Individual Finnish Championship
 1998 – 14th place (2 pts)
 1999 – 13th place (4 pts)
 2000 – 11th place (6+1 pts)
 2001 – 11th place (6+1 pts)
 2002 – 4th place (13 pts)
 2003 – 6th place (10 pts)
 2004 – Runner-up (17 pts)
 2005 – Finnish Champion (65 pts)
 2006 – Runner-up (20 pts)
 2007 – Finnish Champion (25 pts)
 2008 – Finnish Champion (12+3 pts)
 Individual Junior Finnish Championship
 1998 – 4th place (12 pts)
 1999 – Runner-up (17 pts)
 2000 – Runner-up (17 pts)
 2001 – 3rd place (15 pts)
 2002 – 4th place (13 pts)
 2003 – Finnish Champion (20 pts)

See also 
 Finland national speedway team

References 

1982 births
Finnish speedway riders
Eastbourne Eagles riders
Living people